
Pyrzyce County is a unit of territorial administration and local government (powiat) in West Pomeranian Voivodeship, north-western Poland. It came into being on January 1, 1999, as a result of the Polish local government reforms passed in 1998.

As of 2006 its total population is 39,931, out of which the population of Pyrzyce is 12,642, that of Lipiany is 4,124, and the rural population is 23,165.

Neighbouring counties
Pyrzyce County is bordered by Stargard County to the north, Myślibórz County to the south and Gryfino County to the west.

Administrative division
The county is subdivided into six gminas (two urban-rural and four rural). These are listed in the following table, in descending order of population.

References
Polish official population figures 2006

 
Pyrzyce